Akash Senaratne (born 27 September 1996) is a Sri Lankan cricketer. He made his first-class debut for Badureliya Sports Club in the 2015–16 Premier League Tournament on 19 February 2016. He made his List A debut for Kandy District in the 2016–17 Districts One Day Tournament on 25 March 2017.

References

External links
 

1996 births
Living people
Sri Lankan cricketers
Badureliya Sports Club cricketers
Kandy District cricketers
Cricketers from Colombo